Marcus Muller, is a South African actor, writer, producer and model. He is the Mr. South Africa in 2006. He is most notable for the roles in the films Kampterrein, Droomdag, 70X7: Sewentig Maal Sewe and the soap operas Egoli: Place of Gold, Villa Rose and 7de Laan.

Personal life
He had a long standing relationship with fellow actress Therese Benade since 2007. They later separated in 2014.

Career
In 2006, Muller won the Mr. South Africa pageant, which made his turning point of the career. After winning the pageant, he was selected to the popular soap opera Egoli: Place of Gold with the role of legal adviser "Liam de Lange". He continued to play the role for three seasons: 16, 17 and 18, from 2007 to 2010. Then in 2015, he made his film debut with 70X7: Sewentig Maal Sewe directed by Willie Olwage. After the success of the film, he made two more popular roles in the films O Vet! and Droomdag. In 2017, he wrote and produced the comedy film Kampterrein which was directed by Luhann Jansen. In 2021, he joined the cast of soapie 7de Laan.

Filmography

References

External links
 

Living people
South African male television actors
1970 births
Fellows of the American Physical Society